Peterson Laurent (1888-1958) was a Haitian painter. Born in Saint-Marc, Laurent worked as a blacksmith. He typically painted scenes of rural life and United States battleships. Laurent died at about age 70 in Saint-Marc.

References
 
 

1888 births
1958 deaths
20th-century Haitian painters
20th-century male artists
Haitian male painters